Muslims (Arabic: مُسْلِم) are adherents of Islam, an Abrahamic monotheistic religion.

Muslim may also refer to:

 Muslims (ethnic group), a Slavic nationality within former Yugoslavia
 Muslim (name), a male name
 Muslim Quarter, one of the four quarters of the ancient, walled Old City of Jerusalem
 Muslim FC, Pakistani football club
 A Moslem, 1995 Russian drama film directed by Vladimir Khotinenko
 The Muslim Weekly, a Muslim newspaper published in London
 Diary of a Jewish Muslim, a book by Kamal Ruhayyim

See also
 
 
 Muslin, a cotton fabric of plain weave
 Mussulman (disambiguation)